Noah is an American men's clothing brand founded by Brendon Babenzien, based out of its flagship store on 195 Mulberry St. in Soho, New York City. The brand draws from a range of influences street wear and new wave to seaside Long Island. Responsible sourcing and other socially conscious issues have been a focus for the brand.

Noah has two flagship stores in New York City and Tokyo, and also sells its products at the Dover Street Market locations in Los Angeles and London. Noah releases new products on Thursday mornings and sells its products online through the Noah website and through the Dover Street Market E-Shop.

Noah has collaborated on products with Fear of God, Frog Skateboards, Vuarnet, Dover Street Market, and others.

On October 10, 2020 Noah will be releasing their first skate team video titled "Jolie Rouge" 

Closing the book on their longstanding partnership which delivered faux-pony hair Gazelles in 2020 and track-ready footwear and apparel in 2021, NOAH and adidas Originals offer their final SS22 finale collaboration series.

References

 
 
 
 
 

Clothing brands of the United States